Ronald Guttman (born 12 August 1952) is a Belgian actor, theatrical producer and film producer.

Career
Guttman was born in Uccle. He started appearing in French language productions in Europe in 1975, appearing in his first English-language film, Hanna K., in 1983.

Guttman continues to work in both Europe and North America, predominantly in television, including Lost, Lipstick Jungle,  Heroes, The West Wing, Mad Men and Hunters.  He had a recurring role as Alexander Cambias, Sr. on the daytime soap opera All My Children (20 episodes over 18 years) and spots on three series in the Law & Order franchise:  Law & Order, Law & Order: Criminal Intent and Law & Order: Special Victims Unit. In 2021, he had a recurring role as French gangster Jean Jehan in the Epix drama series Godfather of Harlem.

Guttman's performances also include numerous Off-Broadway productions, including The Fifth Column, a play by Ernest Hemingway; the title role in Dennis McIntyre's Modigliani at Jewish Repertory Theatre; and the original production in 1986 of Tina Howe's Coastal Disturbances.. 

His movie roles include The Hunt For Red October, On the Basis of Sex, The Tollbooth, 27 Dresses, The Guru and August Rush.

His company, Highbrow Entertainment, has produced stage and film projects including The Tollbooth, Masked, The Fifth Column, DAI and New York Street Games.

Filmography

Stage appearances

References

External links 

After Hours episode with Ronald Guttman

1952 births
Belgian male film actors
Belgian male stage actors
Living people
20th-century Belgian male actors
21st-century Belgian male actors
Belgian male television actors
People from Uccle